This is a list of characters from the British sitcom The Inbetweeners, which ran for three series from 2008–2010 on E4. A 2011 film was also released, followed by a sequel in 2014.

Cast

Main characters

Will McKenzie

William McKenzie is the central character and the narrator of the show as well. In the pilot episode, Will starts his first day in his new school, Rudge Park Comprehensive, with a briefcase, which leads to him being nicknamed "Briefcase Wanker" and other vulgar variations. For his portrayal as Will, Bird has won the 2008 British Comedy Award for "Best Male Newcomer" and the 2009 British Comedy Award for "Best Actor". He was also nominated for "Best Comedy Performance" at the 2008 Royal Television Society Awards, and "Best Male Performance" in a Comedy Programme at the 2009 BAFTA Awards.

Will is shown to have previously been educated in private school and is extremely out of place in the rougher comprehensive school environment. He is shown to be easily jealous, and has a habit of launching into foul-mouthed rants when he becomes annoyed, often getting himself and his friends into trouble or awkward situations as a result. Will often has trouble engaging with girls, generally panicking in situations where he would end up having sex. As a running joke, Neil often ends up hooking up with the girl Will desired instead. Will is shown to be extremely emotionally dependent on his mother, Polly, despite her continually being a source of embarrassment for him in front of others. Much to Will's agitation, his friends (particularly Jay) and others are all attracted to her, and do not hesitate to make open remarks about it to him.

Will often finds himself the target of bullying in school, partly through school bully Mark Donovan bullying him physically (such as taping him to a chair and placing a bin on his head), but mainly through embarrassment from his sardonic Head of Sixth Form, Mr Gilbert. Will seemingly has a special rivalry with Gilbert, with Gilbert intentionally going out of his way to make Will's time at school miserable.

Simon Cooper

Simon Cooper is the oldest member of the group. He becomes best friends with Will after initially avoiding him due to his "actual briefcase", "clumpy shoes" and "gay hair". Simon's first task of the new term is showing Will to his classes – a task assigned by the Head of Sixth Form, Mr. Gilbert. Simon, being the eldest, is also the first to learn how to drive, after passing his driving test in dubious circumstances. His father buys him an old small, yellow Fiat Cinquecento Hawaii – Simon, Jay, Neil and others think the car is inadequate and dislike the colour, and mock the fact that it has a tape deck. The car's passenger-side door is ripped off due to Jay opening the door prematurely during an argument while Simon was parking and colliding with a sign post at Thorpe Park. However, in "Caravan Club", the door has been replaced with a red one.

Simon has been attracted to his childhood friend Carli D'Amato since they were eight years old. Despite many awkward attempts to show her his feelings – including spray painting "I Love Carli D'Amato" on her driveway – for most of the time she does not reciprocate, partly due to having a boyfriend, Tom, and partly due to his occasionally repulsive behaviour, but in the final episode of the second series: "Exam Time", Carli seems interested in Simon after she split up with her boyfriend Tom, and they kiss while revising for A-levels at Simon's house. Carli agrees to meet Simon at the local pub for a post-exam drink, but when she arrives it was revealed she has reconciled with Tom, to the chagrin of Simon. His parents briefly go on a trial separation in "The Duke of Edinburgh Awards", but they have reconciled by the end of the episode.

In series 3, Simon takes part in the school charity fashion show, but humiliates both himself and Carli when he walks along the catwalk wearing Speedos with a testicle sticking out. In the episode "The Gig and the Girlfriend", Simon gets a girlfriend, Tara, whom he kisses at a concert. The couple break up at the end of the episode "The Trip to Warwick" after they fail to have sex due to Simon being unable to get an erection. Simon is the most volatile of the group, especially when in discussions with his family, where he frequently over-reacts to gentle goading and even advice. He is sometimes shown to be extremely impulsive and bitter, saying and doing things that cause him great embarrassment. He also gets into a slew of unfortunate situations including being physically and verbally attacked (once by a twelve-year-old), accused of being a "paedophile", failing to have sex with his girlfriend Tara after taking Jay's questionable sex advice, and humiliating himself in front of Carli, most notably during the fashion show. In the last episode, the boys play a game where they swap mobile phones, and have to send a text message to anyone of their choice on the phone's contact list. Simon later receives a reply from Carli that leaves him with a smile, which suggests she indicates that she feels the same way as Simon, and indicates that there is more in store for him and Carli.

Jay Cartwright

Jay Cartwright, the youngest of the four protagonists, is obsessed with sex, with almost all his comments being on the subject. He frequently lies and exaggerates about his experiences – sexual and otherwise – often making crude comments about girls in general and offering highly questionable "advice" to his friends, and frequently uses words such as "clunge" and "snatch" to describe women's genitalia. In reality, he is the least sexually experienced of the group and frequently relies on pornography to attain gratification, as he finds it difficult engaging with girls. He is also physically the weakest of the group, with his scrawny physique and small penis size being frequently made fun of throughout the show's run. His father contradicts Jay's exaggerated stories in an often bullying nature, claiming Jay is very unsuccessful with women (this is likely the source of Jay's obsession), and is always putting him down in some way or another. He is self-righteous, duplicitous and untrustworthy, often inventing stories about his various exploits and giving his friends bad advice about sex to lift his ego, while being aware that they will likely fail. In other instances, however, his poor advice can be a product of naivety, albeit driven by a desire to appear experienced.

At the end of the first series, Jay opens up to John Webster, admitting that many of his stories are somewhat exaggerated because he is worried that people do not notice him, and that he is afraid of being ignored. However, he throws this side of him away when Samantha, a girl possessing many similar characteristics to Jay, starts chatting to him. He seldom performs any acts of kindness and he routinely insults even his closest friends, with his comments reaching a more severe level than the insults the rest of the group frequently exchange. In one of the deleted scenes he even insults Will in German. It is implied in the last episode that Jay may have been sexually abused by his former next-door neighbour, when Neil mentions a "game" that Jay and the neighbour used to "play" in the garden shed, which Jay denies abruptly.

Jay's only friend who genuinely likes him is Neil, mostly because he is naïve enough to believe Jay's stories. Another recurring theme of Jay's character is that he often steals things, such as hair removal cream ("Duke of Edinburgh Awards") and a flyer for a house party ("Will's Birthday") from a girl named Sadie Cunningham during registration. He also often gets Simon into trouble for things he had said, most notably getting Simon throttled by a man after Jay shouts "bus wankers!" through the car window. By the start of the third series, Jay is driving his Mum's car. His driving skills are awful, making Will "feel like Princess Diana", and he later reveals that he has not yet passed his test and is only able to drive on the pretext that Neil is "giving him a lesson".

Neil Sutherland

Neil Sutherland is the dull-witted and gentle giant of the group. Due to his gullibility, he is usually the only person who believes Jay's stories and often fails to understand the sarcasm in Will's one-liners. His friends tease him about his father Kevin allegedly being a closeted homosexual; both Neil and his father strongly deny this. He has, along with Jay and Simon, passed his driving test and owns a modified Vauxhall Nova GSi, but cannot drive it as it does not have an engine. He takes part in the school's version of Blind Date and wins an unwanted date with Susie, one of the school's "freaks". He works at Thorpe Park, and also works on-off over the series at Asda. He can do "The Robot" and has a crush on his biology teacher Miss Timms. Despite being naïve, he is well-meaning and confident compared to the rest of the group.

Neil is the most sexually experienced of the group; a recurring theme is that Neil ends up hooking up with women originally fancied by Will. He spent a night in Simon's car with a punk girl in the series one episode "Caravan Club". He says that he snogged and fingered Charlotte Hinchcliffe after Will was with her, although he informs Will only of the snog to protect his friend's feelings from further being hurt (he tells the other two silently via hand gestures behind Will's back). He also manages to get a blowjob from Will's crying date Kerry at his 18th birthday party. Neil is also revealed to have sexual encounters with unseen female characters on the show, including much older colleague Karen at Asda. In the final episode of series 3, Neil wrongly assumes that he has impregnated her, but receives a text correcting him. He celebrates the fact that he has likely contracted chlamydia from her, wrongly believing it to be a good thing. Neil in part is more successful with women than the rest of the group due to his unassuming and unquestioning character. For instance, in "Caravan Club", Will rebuffs the advances of a promiscuous punk girl due to a lack of romantic sentiment. Neil however demonstrates no such concerns, experiencing the same "pushy" approach but accepting it readily. 

Neil's middle name is revealed to be Lindsay in a deleted scene from series 3, at his 18th birthday party.

Neil has an attractive older sister, Katie, whom the boys stare at when visiting Neil's; however, he usually does not get angry or offended by the attention like Will does about his mother Polly, more likely because he is oblivious and laid-back. His father is often shown to be exasperated by Neil's ignorance and constantly says in an unimpressed tone "Neil!". Recurring jokes are that despite his lack of intelligence, Neil tends to be right about meaningless facts and that he sometimes gets with girls whom Will is pursuing. Neil sometimes hooks up with much older, unattractive women – he is shown to be surprised when he thinks Karen is pregnant because she told him that she could not have any more children. In the Inbetweeners Movie Neil similarly gets with a middle-aged dinner lady.

Secondary characters

Mr Gilbert

Phil Gilbert (Greg Davies) is the school's head of sixth form. He is sardonic, sadistic, misanthropic, dry, and possesses no enthusiasm for his occupation, once telling Will that "the only reason people go into teaching is because they are unambitious, unlucky and the relaxed rules on police background checks". When he is not being a bully, he shows no regard for the students or their welfare. On the occasions he does stop wrongdoing, he defuses the situation without resolving the issues that caused it.

Carli D'Amato
 
 Played by Emily Head
 2008–2011

Carli D'Amato is Simon's love interest and has been since they were eight years old. She is popular and attractive, with an older rugby-player boyfriend named Tom, making her even more unattainable. Although she is well aware of his strong attraction to her, she only seems to think of Simon as a platonic friend, and is usually put off by his behaviour, although she is not above stringing him along to gain his favour. Simon is oblivious to Carli's selfish and manipulative personality, although his friends are not easily as fooled. On several occasions, Will and Jay have openly expressed dislike for her, with Will pointing out that she merely strings him along, and Jay calling her "stuck-up." She throws Simon small bits of affection to keep his hopes up in her. In "Exam Time", she asks if she can revise for her exams at his house, and when there, mentions that she has broken up with her boyfriend; when she notices Simon trying to impress her, she uses the opportunity to get him to help tutor her for a subject that he is not even studying himself. He ends up spending the entire revision period studying for her Geography exam, so he can continue to tutor her, instead of his own exams. When he later thinks they have a chance at dating, she promptly tells him she is back with Tom.

In episode one of series three, a wedge is driven between Carli and Simon after he accidentally revealed one of his testicles in the fashion show, believing he did it on purpose to make a fool out of her. However, in the series finale, Carli seems to be more affectionate towards Simon, hinting at a potential relationship, were Simon not moving to Swansea. She later replies to a prank text, sent by the boys from Simon's phone. Simon refuses to reveal the nature of the response, but is pleased upon reading it.

Between the end of the series and the beginning of the film, Simon and Carli have been dating, but she breaks up with him as she wants to be single whilst going on holiday and at university, obviously having viewed their relationship with a lot less investment than Simon. The boys' attempts to get him over Carli are the catalyst for going on holiday to Malia, although they find once there that Neil had thoughtlessly booked them onto the same holiday as her, which Simon views as a sign he should win her back. He rebuffs the advances of a nice girl named Lucy in his attempts to win Carli back, but she has formed a relationship with James, her narcissistic holiday rep. At a boat party, she and James fall out and Carli asks Simon to kiss her to make James feel jealous. Simon eventually realises that Carli is using him for her own ends and breaks up with her for good.

Mark Donovan
 
 Played by Henry Lloyd-Hughes
 2008–2011

Mark Donovan is the foul-mouthed school bully, who often targets Will. This is partly because he caught Will kissing his ex-girlfriend Charlotte. He is the typical bully, who is friendly and patient in front of parents or teachers, but is otherwise a thuggish hoodlum. Donovan is somewhat sensitive, demanding that Will be "gentle" with Charlotte, whilst threatening him with death if he speaks of it. He appears to be less hostile (yet by no means friendlier) towards Jay, Simon and Neil and dubs the boys as a collective; "Team Twat". In Series 3, it is revealed that Donovan smokes cannabis. Jay and Neil attempt to buy some off him upon learning of this, only for him to take the money and sarcastically give them tea granules wrapped in cling film. He was mentioned in the third episode when Donovan attacked Neil in detention and pinned him down and drew penises on the cast that Neil was wearing.

Donovan reappears in the film, after Mr Gilbert's speech, where he says "goodbye" to the boys, whom he calls the "bender squad". He then proceeds to give Will an extremely painful wedgie, until Carli tells him to stop. In the deleted scenes, the wedgie is performed so strongly the underwear used for the wedgie is torn off of Will. He was meant to follow the boys to Greece, but the producers could not fit this into the story so Donovan's role was significantly cut down.

Charlotte Hinchcliffe
 
 Played by Emily Atack
 2008–2010
 Charlotte "Big Jugs" Hinchcliffe is the most attractive and popular girl in the school. She is very confident and a year above the four boys. Unlike most of the popular girls, Charlotte is very friendly and genuinely likes Will despite his tendency to parade his interactions with her and attempts to intercept her relationships with other male students. Charlotte has a reputation for being promiscuous and mentions to Will that she has had "eleven lovers already," later on having sex with Simon's sex-crazed French exchange student, Patrice, shortly after meeting him. She kisses Will on two different occasions and the two plan to have sex after Will, a virgin, claims that he has had sex multiple times before. Despite her reputation and nickname, and the stereotypes shown with other popular girls in the school — notably Carli — Charlotte is a very sweet and compassionate girl. Described as "kind and gentle and fragile" by her ex-boyfriend Mark Donovan, Charlotte is more genuine than other popular girls in the school and maintains a romantic connection to Will even after she graduates, serving as his chief love interest throughout the series. Unfortunately, he often makes a fool of himself in front of her and occasionally offends her, even going so far as to tactlessly exaggerate his relationship with her to the men at the garage where he spends his work experience.

Tara Brown
 Played by Hannah Tointon
 2010
 Tara Brown is in the year below the four main characters and becomes a love interest for Simon when he accidentally sits on her in the common room, after which they talk and she invites him to a gig. A bubbly, hyper and impulsive girl, she becomes Simon's girlfriend in the episode "The Gig and the Girlfriend". Simon promises to bring cannabis to the gig, after Jay claims (falsely) that his friend could get them some. They eventually do find some cannabis and all get high. In the same episode, Tara gets injured while "moshing" and, from a combination of being stoned and concussed, she feels queasy and faint and is sick just before she kisses Simon. Will goes to Simon for help when he has an adverse reaction to the drugs but he is too busy, as Will puts it, "licking the vomit off her tonsils", to care. Tara has a mostly ambivalent attitude towards Will, Jay and Neil, but does try and set up Will with her close friend Kerry in "The Gig and the Girlfriend" via a double date at Waterside shopping centre. Her final appearance is in the episode "The Trip to Warwick", in which Simon and Tara plan to go to her sister's house in Warwick to have sex. Simon brings along the other boys, annoying Tara. Simon scares Tara after he cannot get an erection (after following some fairly unhelpful advice from Jay), and attempts to induce one by hitting his penis. He and the other boys then get kicked out of Tara's sister's house in the middle of the night and Simon receives a text telling him to never contact her again.

When her name is mentioned, Jay often mimics the sound of Morse code on a telegram as if in a newsroom, making a "beepity beep beepity beep" noise and exclaiming "Tara update!", because Simon talks about her frequently during their short relationship. He manages to keep this up even when vomiting due to a hangover on the car journey back from Warwick.

John Webster
 Played by John Seaward
 2008–2011
 "Big" John Webster is a slow-witted student who joined the school at the same time as Will. He is frequently bullied for being obese and is often seen eating. His most prominent appearance is in the last episode of the first series, where he has a deep conversation with Jay, although the latter throws this away when attracted by Samantha. In the third episode of the second series, despite his general unpopularity, he is invited to a party to which Will, Jay, Simon and Neil are not invited, and is seen successfully flirting with a girl at the party – with his hand on her breast. He is later seen sporadically throughout the series. In the first film, while Mr. Gilbert is giving his hate-filled end of year speech, John is briefly seen sniffing his underarms when Mr Gilbert mentions that he "actively dislikes" some students for their "poor personal hygiene".

John Kennedy
 
 Played by Waen Shepherd
 2009–2010
 John "Paedo" Kennedy is a Geography teacher at Rudge Park. A rumour frequently circulates of him being a paedophile (according to Simon, he was once caught masturbating to the school orchestra in the music cupboard), and he shows a particular attraction toward Neil. He goes as far in Series 2 to take Neil "skinny dipping" whilst on a geography trip and buys Neil a bottle of vodka as an incentive for him to do so, before sneaking into the boys' dormitory in the middle of the night and inappropriately massaging Neil's leg. Neil, however, seems oblivious to Kennedy's actions until he reappears in "The Fashion Show". Mr. Gilbert makes it clear that he is aware of Kennedy's tendencies, stating that he "has his fucking neck on the line" for him. He is still, however, employed by the school, much to the incredulity of the boys.

Minor and one-off characters

David Glover
Played by Richie Hart
2008–2010
David Glover is a student at the school who appears in several episodes but does not say very much. He is popular and looks down on the four primary characters, referring to Will as a "posh little prick" and calling Neil a "twat". He ignores Will on his first day when he attempts to make friends with him. David is often seen in the background playing his Nintendo DS and snooker at school in the common room. On the school trip to Swanage, he is seen answering the door at the party and conferring with Mark Donovan as to whether to let the boys in. However, in "Xmas Party", Glover ends up defending Will from Donovan's harm, while even still referring to him as a "specky short-arse". In "Exam Time", Neil mentioned that he thinks that Jay's new girlfriend Chloe "got off" with Glover. In The Inbetweeners Yearbook, he is briefly mentioned by Neil in the map of Rudge Park; Neil says that he and Jay had a fight outside of school and that the video was uploaded to YouTube but taken down shortly afterwards for being too violent. This is highly doubtful however and is probably a lie told by Jay to Neil.

David
Played by Greg Coker
2008–2010
David is a new student who arrives at the school the same time as Will. He is seen as one of the school "freaks" and is friends with John Webster. David appears infrequently through the series, helping organise the Christmas prom and attending Neil's 18th birthday party. His only lines are in the deleted scenes of Series 1, where he and Susie introduce themselves to each other, and there is another deleted scene where he is forced to seemingly eat his own badge by Mark Donovan. In the first episode of Series 2 he is glimpsed on more than one occasion.

"Football Friend"
 Played by Luke Norris
 2008
 A friend of Jay's who he claims to have met during trials for West Ham United ("that never happened", according to Simon). Will, Simon and Neil continuously mock Jay for having a friend outside of their group by saying "Friend!", "Football Friend!" or "Car Friend!" in a high-pitched voice, and giving him a thumbs-up gesture. This irritates Jay to the extent that, upon seeing Football Friend's car at the side of the road one day, jumps up and down on the bonnet violently, yelling "fucking football friend" until he arrives on the scene and chases them off. Jay says later that he had to borrow £300 to have the car repaired and stop the friend calling the police.

Becky
 Played by Clemency Hallian
 2008
 Becky is, like Jay, a regular visitor to the caravan club in Camber Sands. When the boys head on a weekend to the caravan club, Jay promises the group that they will meet her and that she is largely promiscuous. She texts Simon, after sorting it out with Jay prior to the group's arrival, a picture of herself, which makes Simon think that she likes him and wants to have sex with him. At the caravan club disco, Simon wrongly believes that she does want sex with him after she danced with him and they share a kiss, and he undresses himself in front of her, which scares her off and causes Simon to have an argument with Jay because he lied to him. Jay then says that he has not (as he had previously claimed) had sex with her or her sister; just with "other, similar" girls at the caravan club.

"Punk Girl"
 Played by Suzi Battersby
 2008
 The Punk Girl is around the same age as the boys and has red hair and a goth type personality. She is seen on her own at the caravan club disco. Upon meeting Will, she asks him to go outside to have sex with her (this being after they have already kissed), but Will, who wants to delay it, suggests they should get to know each other a bit more first. In a bid to postpone sex with her, he begins to childishly slide along the wooden floor on his socks. Ultimately, this puts her off him completely. Later on at the disco, she is impressed by Neil's dance moves and it is discovered on the drive home that Neil fingered her in the night and she gave him handjobs, having slept in Simon's car.

Lauren Harris
 
 Played by Jayne Wisener
 2009
 Lauren Harris is a Northern Irish girl who joins the school in the first episode of the second series. Will sits next to her on the coach to Swanage, where he confuses her with his impression of the Star Wars character, Yoda, which she assumes is a social impairment. She hangs out with the group for the duration of the trip, with both Will and Simon attracted to her. To Will's frustration, she quickly becomes attracted to Simon and has no interest in Will. Will well and truly blows it by swearing at Lauren while in an agitated state. After the trip to Swanage, Will says in the closing narration that she moved away.

Susie
 Played by Anabel Barnston
 2008
 Susie is a geeky girl who joined the school along with Will. She is taking her A-Levels four years early. She has an interest in Russian literature, and Neil, to his dismay, picked her in the charity blind date. Neil reluctantly takes Susie to Milwaukee Fried Chicken; however, owing to the age difference, her mother came with them too. Will, Simon and Jay go to watch them under the impression that Neil and his date are sitting around a bargain bucket.

Samantha Leah
 Played by Jo Maycock
 2008
 Samantha is a female version of Jay from the episode "Xmas Party", stating that Jay's monologue on sensitivity and trust made him seem "bent" (a word-for-word copy of the statement Jay made to Simon earlier in the same episode) and telling an unbelievable lie that she "used to DJ at a top club in Ibiza" (highly unlikely for someone of school age) and that she could "probably" get him a regular spot there. Taken aback by this which seemed more like something that Jay himself would say, he invites her to spend part of the school prom in the DJ booth. He later claims that she gave him a blowjob; another outrageous lie that is quickly dismissed by the other boys and logically broken down to a handjob and then just to that he had ejaculated in his pants with questionable and unsubstantiated stimulus.

Daisy
 Played by Catherine Steadman
 2009
 Daisy used to be Will's babysitter. She is invited to Will's mother Polly's barbecue, and mentioned that she works at a local care home. Will, Simon and Neil soon after work at the care home as volunteers on part of their Duke of Edinburgh award scheme. Will hits it off with Daisy, and after going on a date (which is actually just Daisy saying thank you to Will for covering her at work) they go back to her flat. Unfortunately, Will has no pubic hair because Neil and Jay had sprayed hair removal cream in his underpants whilst he was asleep in the common room. Will decided to follow Simon's advice and "wear a wig down there". When Daisy finds the wig, she is confused. She has been concerned throughout their relationship that Will was too young for her, and seeing him now without any pubic hair causes her to feel very guilty and want nothing more to do with him.

Miss Timms
 Played by Amanda St. John
 2008
 Miss Timms is a Biology teacher at Rudge Park Comprehensive. Neil, Jay and Simon find her very attractive, although Will, as an outsider, thinks that the idea of her extreme attractiveness is just a "subconscious comparison" to the other "older, unattractive" teachers at their school. Whilst drunk at the school disco, Neil attempts to kiss her, but gets an erection and is then escorted outside by Mr Gilbert.

Chris D'Amato
 Played by Deo Simcox
 2008, 2010
Chris D'Amato is Carli's younger brother. In the series one episode Bunk Off, Will upsets him by telling him about terrorists. Afterwards, Simon accidentally vomits on him. In the series three episode Camping Trip, a drunk Simon sneaks into his bedroom in the middle of the night and feels him up, believing it to be Carli's room. This causes Chris further distress.

Chloe
 Played by Lizzie Stables
 2009
 Chloe dates Jay in the finale episode of the second series after meeting him at a bus stop. In contrast to his usual sexual comments regarding girls, Jay appears to genuinely care about Chloe, as he becomes more sensitive and disregards Neil's sexual comments about her (which Neil had only initially said to gain Jay's approval, as such comments are more typical of Jay's character). At the end of the episode, Chloe ends the relationship with Jay after he takes his father Terry's advice and constantly texts and checks up on her, with her believing Jay to be too sensitive and clingy. Jay breaks down in front of Will, but in a false show of bravado claims he was the one who dumped her because she was "frigid". Chloe is later mentioned by Will in "Will's Dilemma", but Jay appears on the verge of tears when she is referenced, suggesting he has yet to get over the relationship ending.

Rachel
 Played by Lily Lovett
 2009–2010
 Rachel is Carli's best friend who is disdainful of Simon for his embarrassing obsession with Carli. She plays a main role in the episode Night Out in London where Will attempts to "pull" her in a London nightclub when he is amazed that she likes him enough to speak to him. However, she goes for another boy. Rachel is seen in numerous other episodes in the other series as well, mostly with Carli, although does not feature prominently in any of them.

Tom
 Played by Ollie Holme
 2008–2009
 Tom is Carli's boyfriend. A few years older than she is and so not at the school, he is a rugby player who neglects her for his teammates. They split up in the final episode of series two, only to reconcile at the end of the episode.

Patrice
 Played by Vladimir Consigny
 2009
 Patrice is a French exchange student, the son of Pamela Cooper's friend. He stays with Simon for a short time, displays little interest in the boys, and has bad habits that include urinating in gardens. Patrice is a racist who spontaneously tells Will that he dislikes Arabs. He shows little regard to accepted social norms and openly tells Will that his mother Polly "has the sex" (is sexy) and later that he had just masturbated in the bathroom whilst thinking about her. Patrice is very attractive to women – even Simon and Will's mothers seem to fancy him. He is seen in bed with Charlotte at a party; Mark Donovan shows up and Will tells him that Charlotte is upstairs. The closing narration of the episode alludes to Patrice having been attacked by Donovan – to Will's delight.

Danny Moore
 Played by Charlie Wernham
 2009
 Danny Moore appears in series 2 episode 2. He is a 12-year-old boy; his family are said to be involved in crime in Northwood. He starts a feud with Simon after he bumped into him while walking to class. Jay insults him for his angry reaction while his back is turned, with Danny incorrectly assuming Simon made the remark. When Simon is receiving a handjob from Hannah Fields at a disco, Danny comes out of nowhere and knocks Simon to the floor before kicking him in the groin, thereafter finding several older boys from Northwood who hunt the boys with the intention of beating them up. The boys hide in the toilet until Polly arrives to pick them up.

Jim
 Played by Cavan Clerkin
2009
 Jim is the head mechanic at the garage Will is sent to for work experience in the second episode of Series 2. An impudent Cockney, he attempts a snipe hunt on Will on the first day (only for Will to catch on), and later, along with the other mechanics, strips Will and throws him into a lake after inviting him out to a pub. He believes Will to be a virgin, and upon learning of Charlotte, expresses desire to "check her out", because Will claimed that he has sex with her. At the under-18s disco, Jim speaks to Charlotte over Wolfie's mobile phone, telling her all of Will's outrageous allegations about their relationship.

Wolfie
 Played by David Fynn
2009
 Wolfie is one of the assistant mechanics at the garage Will was sent to, along with his boss Jim. He is seventeen years old (or at least claims to be) but appears much older due to his deep voice and facial hair, with Will describing him as "looking about thirty". He goes to the under-eighteen's disco to check out Charlotte, who Will previously bragged about having sex with to the two after they said he was unsuccessful sexually. There, he puts her on the phone to Jim, who informs her of all of Will's allegations about her "going like a porn star", to which she throws a drink in his face and dismisses him.

Hannah Fields
 Played by Holly Peplow
 2009
 Hannah Fields appears in the series 2 episode "Work Experience". She is discussed when it is found that Simon has received a Valentine's card from her. She then appears later in the episode at the under-18s disco where she gives Simon a handjob and passionately snogs him due to being drunk - until he is attacked by Danny Moore.

Kerry
 Played by Abbey Mordue
 2010
 "Big" Kerry (also referred to as "Bigfoot") is a friend of Tara's whom Will begrudgingly went on a date with. Although not attracted to her because of her height, he stays with her in the hope that according to Simon he may get oral sex from her. Unsuccessful, he tries to break-up with her at Neil's party, but is thrown out because it turns out that her father had died recently (unbeknownst to Will), and Will has offended her in trying to defend himself. Will is thrown out of Neil's house and banned from it by Neil's father Kevin, who reports the incident to Polly and as a result Will is grounded for three weeks although he apologised to Neil for ruining his birthday party, only for Neil to reveal that Kerry had given him blowjobs after the guys had left, much to Will's disappointment shock.

Alistair Scott
 Played by Steven Webb
 2010
 Alistair is a wheelchair-using student who had a kidney transplant after one failed. Rudge Park school organised a fashion show in support of his charity. Despite being popular on his return, Alistair is arrogant, short tempered, immature and unpleasant. He throws tantrums when upset by Will, who tries to usurp the fashion show because he believes it is a "vanity fest" instead of a suitable charitable event, at one point becoming hysterical and trying to ram Will's legs with his chair.

The Tramp
Played by Robert McCafferty
2009
 A Scottish tramp who lives in an alleyway beside the nightclub the boys go to in London. He is first heard shouting "hammerhead shark". When Simon is unable to enter because of his trainers, he reluctantly trades shoes with him to get in, only to find that they are soaked with urine. Carli notices this, and leaves Simon, disgusted. Simon returns to him after leaving the club, to discover that his new trainers are also now saturated with urine and faecal matter.

Angry Neighbour/"The Fat Old Shit"
 Played by Mark Roper
2010
 The man whose front garden is frequently vandalised by Jay and Neil. When Will eventually participates in the vandalism, the boys are caught. Angry at his daffodils being destroyed by the four boys, he arrives at Will's house the next day to try and confront them, but instead informs Will's mother; who has just arrived home from her weekend break to the Cotswolds.

Steve
 
 Played by Doc Brown.
 2010
 A drug dealer who appears in the Series 3 episode "The Gig And The Girlfriend". When the group are looking for drugs at the gig, Jay and Neil see Steve giving a man something discreetly that they assume is drugs, but when they go over to ask for him for some, he says that they think he is a drug dealer because he is black. Regardless, he lets the boys buy drugs from him and even rolls it up, following Jay's plea.

Mrs. D'Amato
 Played by an unnamed extra.
2008
 Mrs. D'Amato is Carli's mother. She only appears in the series one episode "Bunk Off", when the boys are waiting outside the wine shop for Will. She so happens to be passing by on the street and Jay takes the opportunity to embarrass Simon by quickly telling her Simon's feelings towards Carli. Mrs. D'Amato does not say anything, but gives the boys an annoyed look. The only other time she is mentioned is in the very first episode when Carli asked Simon not to mention the night out at the pub to his folks as he knows what her mum is like, and the last episode of Series 2 where Carli tells Simon that her mum was always listening in when Carli split up with Tom (which is the cause of how Simon discovers they have split up).

Sophie Brown
 Played by Charlie Covell.
2010
 Sophie is Tara's older sister, who is studying at Warwick University. She is suspicious of and hostile to the four boys, especially Simon. Over the course of the boys' visit to Sophie's student accommodation, Jay walks into her room at night whilst drunk and attempts to seduce her flatmate Heike, Neil urinates while sleeping in his and Will's bed, Will eats one of her plants for a dare, and Simon starts acting strangely – sexually – with Tara. She throws the boys out, despite Will's attempts to persuade her to let them stay, after threatening to call the police if they do not leave.

Sneezy Heike 
 Played by Ambrosine Falck.
 2010
 Heike is Sophie's Dutch flatmate. Sophie has to share her bed so that Simon and Tara can have sex in Sophie's bed. In "Trip To Warwick" she is first seen when she walks into the room and meets Jay and Neil and has a very bad cold. She is seen later in bed with Sophie when Jay asks her for sex, but Sophie kicks him out, although not before he offers to have sex with Sophie as well. Heike does not live up to Jay's expectations that Dutch women are "always the filthiest", and is not is not seen or mentioned again after this episode.

The University Boys: The Bombardier, The Commander and The Admiral
 Played by Lewis Linford, Jack Brear and Daniel Kirrane
2010
 Lewis, Joe and Daniel are three obnoxious students who frequently play loud drinking games in Sophie's living room. The three are typical university students and as such their drunken behaviour disturbs Will, who previously assumed that his evenings at university would involve intellectual debate. They immediately nickname Will "Speccy" and later engage him in a game of "Question", demanding that he (and Jay and Neil) down a can of beer for asking a question. The boys later convince Jay that Sophie's Dutch housemate, Heike, is sexually attracted to younger boys.

Fergus
Played by Scott Biggerstaff
2010
Fergus is a friend of Will's mother Polly who she is going on holiday with to the Cotswolds in Series 3 episode 5. Polly apparently caught up with him on Facebook and Will quickly has suspicions that there is sex involved; this and the fact Polly is on Facebook is the basis for much interest from Jay and Neil who repeatedly make jokes about it. Fergus himself is only seen briefly, waiting in his car to leave with Polly. Will immediately has a dislike towards him and berates his mother for her lack of judgement in going on an internet date with someone she hardly knows asking "where's he taking you? A ditch off the A40?". He is mentioned again at the very end of that episode in the closing narrating comments when Will says his mum was dumped immediately because Fergus could not put up with a "problem child".

Mrs. Springett 
Played by an unknown actor 
2010
Mrs Springett is an elderly woman, presumed to be a close neighbour. Polly asks her to pop by to check if everything is okay during Series 3 episode 5 when Will is home alone for the weekend. She makes her extremely brief appearance later on in the episode the next morning when she "hears banging" (not knowing it was coming from the angry neighbour) and tries to come into the house. Will panics and quickly kicks the door shut on her, knocking her down. When Will's mum returns home, Mrs Springett is shown to have suffered a broken nose after being hit by the door.

Tracey
 Played by Oriane Messina
 2008
 Tracey is the examiner during Simon's driving test. She makes several unsubtle attempts at flirting with Simon, although he seems oblivious to this. It is implied that she ensures Simon passes the test in exchange for him allowing her to feel him up.

Mr Sethi
Played by Ash Varrez
2008
Mr Sethi is the owner of the suit shop where the boys hire their Christmas party suits in S1 E6. The recommendation came from Simon’s dad, who has borrowed many suits from Sethi over the years. One particular incidence involved Simon’s dad leaving grass stains on the rental suit when engaging in sexual activity with Simon’s mum, leaving Sethi unimpressed, with Simon's dad claiming "once, Sethi went mental".

“Too Jazzy?”

Family

Polly McKenzie
 Played by Belinda Stewart-Wilson
 2008–2014
Polly is Will's young attractive mother, whom several of his classmates have stated their attraction to. Because of her separation from his father, she cannot afford to continue sending Will to a private school. This sets up the pilot episode, but she attributes their house and school move to him having been bullied. Will is often teased about his mother's attractiveness, although Polly is often oblivious to their desires, such as assuming in the series 3 episode "Home Alone" that the boys are giving genuine gaming advice when they tell her to "bounce around" to improve her performance in a video game.

Polly often overshares details or stories about Will, who is seen to be embarrassed by his mother, like in "Home Alone" she asks Neil to insert a suppository to cure Will's migraines, when she told Simon and Mark Donovan in "Thorpe Park" about the time he cried on the ghost train, when, aged seven and drunk on shandy, he "pulled down his pants" and ran around yelling "I've got a white slug". She also often gives well-intentioned advice or praise to Will, but phrases it horribly and makes him feel self-conscious, like when she tells Will not to pursue Charlotte Hinchcliffe, the most popular girl in school, by telling him that someone like him should "go for one of the plainer girls. Let the good-looking boys go out with the good-looking girls" or when she tells him she can trust that he will not take drugs because he is boring. Because of Will's sarcastic replies, she usually looks pleased with herself afterwards. However, Will seems to have quite a childlike attachment to his mother, whom he cries to when he is upset and gets her to report his bullying to Mr Gilbert.

Polly attempts to begin a relationship with a former schoolfriend named Fergus, the first since her separation, but it is ruined by Will's dramatic reaction and consequently getting drunk and vandalising a garden; Fergus breaks up with Polly because he cannot deal with a "problem child".

In the second film, Polly begins a relationship with Will's former head of sixth form, Mr Gilbert. Originally, when she is seen on Skype, Will becomes suspicious on seeing that she has laid two bowls for breakfast, although she pretends that Will's grandmother is staying. Then, at the end of the film, Polly announces to Will that she and Mr Gilbert have entered into a relationship and are engaged, to Will's horror as Mr Gilbert is to become his new stepfather.

Pamela Cooper
 Played by Robin Weaver
 2008–2014
Pamela is Simon's mother. She is caring and supportive to him, but her efforts to help are often met by embarrassment and surliness from Simon, who can find her overbearing. The details of her sex life are often shared with the boys by Mr. Cooper, which makes Simon feel awkward. When Simon is being unreasonable, she attempts to reason with him and make the best of things, which usually serves to make him more ill-tempered.

In one episode, Mr. and Mrs. Cooper separate temporarily, which upsets her greatly; however when Simon hears her about her crying, he describes it as "blubbering" that embarrasses and annoys him. However, Mr and Mrs Cooper reconcile by the end of the episode, and according to Will's narration, have noisy sex upstairs whilst the boys are in the front room.

Alan Cooper
 Played by Martin Trenaman
 2008–2014
Alan is Simon's father. He constantly reminds Simon (and the other boys) of his sex life, often going into unwelcome, inappropriate, intimate detail of his sexual life both with and before his marriage to Pamela. While dropping the boys off at the airport he tells the boys that they are in for a great time stating "girls just seem to let themselves go a bit more abroad". Despite his sexual nature Alan is an ultimately caring parent and reasonable disciplinarian, but Simon claims he has a tendency to "go mental" when Simon does something irresponsible or lets him down, such as going out to London at night and not attending the father/son golf tournament.

Andrew Cooper
 Played by Dominic Applewhite
 2008–2010
Andrew is Simon's younger brother, with whom he often argues. He has been seen to outsmart Simon on more than one occasion, and it seems that he has a bit of disdain for Simon's uncool "sad case" status, suggesting he is probably more popular and more liked at school than Simon.

In the series finale when Mr Cooper announces that after a hard decision, he is moving the family to Swansea, Simon reacts badly and says he will stay in London and get a flat with Jay, and that Andrew can live there too; Andrew flatly refuses to even consider it, implying that he would rather move to Wales than live with Simon and Jay.

Mrs Cartwright
 Played by Victoria Willing
 2008–2011
 Mrs Cartwright is Jay's mother. She is amicable and easy going, providing food for the boys in "Caravan Club" and making conversation. In situations where she and Mr Cartwright are together, she often takes a secondary role due to his vulgar and forthright manner. Due to Jay's constant masturbation, she has unwittingly interrupted Jay on several occasions, much to his embarrassment.

Terry Cartwright
 Played by David Schaal
 2008–2014
 Terry is Jay's overweight and verbally abusive father. He has poor toilet hygiene, and frequently ridicules Jay's stories about girls. Despite this, he seems to get along well with Will, Simon and Neil, for instance encouraging Will to stand up for himself against some children who had stolen his shoes. Such support is not found in his conversations with Jay, which are either humiliating ("with your brains you'll be fucking lucky to get a job throwing shit into a skip") or poor advice expressed with little interest. He finds amusement in revealing to the other boys that Jay's stories about his alleged numerous sexual experiences are untrue. Despite Mr Cartwright's jokes at Jay's expense, Jay still lies about his father's life to impress his friends, claiming he "used to nick Ferraris for the Mafia" and played in a "private poker tournament with the Krays". In reality, Terry's life is less glamorous, running a building plant hire yard and enjoying caravan holidays and watching horse racing.

Kevin Sutherland
 Played by Alex Macqueen
 2008–2014
 Kevin is Neil's easy-going mild-mannered father, who is often the subject of rumours of his alleged closet homosexuality. He vehemently denies this, despite the boys (bar Neil) and their parents suggesting he is a homosexual, with Will drunkenly calling him a "bumder" ("a cross between a 'bummer' and a 'bender'") to his face. Despite the frequent accusations, there is no true evidence to the viewer or the characters that Kevin is actually a homosexual. Aside from this, Kevin is patient and understanding, laughing about Will and Simon's truancy and drunk behaviour with their parents and trying his best to help Neil do well at school.

Neil's mum
Neil's mother is mentioned several times throughout the show. She is divorced from Neil's father, Kevin. Neil claims that she was in a "difficult place". She has since dated a man similar to Kevin, leading Neil to believe that she has a type. She bought Neil a motorbike for his eighteenth birthday, which Jay crashed shortly afterwards. She is the only parent among the four boys who does not appear in the series or the films.

Katie Sutherland 
 Played by Kacey Barnfield
 2009–2010
 Katie is Neil's attractive elder sister who currently lives at home with the Sutherlands, and has a boyfriend who works in a BP Garage. Katie is assertive and often loosely hostile towards the boys (bar her brother, Neil) and revealing in "A Night Out In London" that she is fully aware of Will, Jay and Simon's physical attraction towards her.

Neil's gran
Played by Stephanie Fayerman
2010
Neil's gran is only ever seen once at Neil's 18th birthday party and is shocked when Neil tells Simon "not to spunk on his bed sheets". She is later shocked by what she perceives as Will's ill treatment of Kerry.

Mr McKenzie 
 
 Played by Anthony Head
 2011 
 Will's dad is mentioned throughout the series but he does not appear until the movie, in which he announces he has just married a woman who is, according to Will, only four years older than Will, making her 22. It also appears he has no real interest left in Will due to his social awkwardness. He appears first right at the beginning of the film and again during the credits, where he receives a picture of Will with Alison in Malia. Upon seeing it, he smiles, knowing he can now be proud of his son.

Unseen characters

Katie Sutherland's boyfriend
Katie's boyfriend is first mentioned in the episode "Thorpe Park" in which Neil tells the boys that he works as a cashier at a local BP garage (the boys mistakenly assume that he's a mechanic). He is mentioned again later in the show where he is again referred to as a mechanic.

The Headmaster - Mr Hopkins
The Headmaster has a speaking role in a deleted scene in series 1 in which he is played by Martin Ball. In the first episode he can be seen sitting next to Mr. Gilbert but he does not say anything. He does not appear in the assembly in the film.

Sadie Cunningham
Sadie is a girl in Jay's tutor group, and sits next to Jay. Jay often steals things out of her bag, including hair removal cream and an invite card to Louise Graham's birthday party. There is a real actor who plays Sadie and it turns out that she has a "voice only" part; in Series 3 Episode 1 when Neil is complaining with Simon that he cannot see the girls because of the curtain, one of the girls overhears and angrily tells Neil from the other side "We can hear you". This is the voice of the actor who plays Sadie (it is revealed in the commentary from the main characters on the DVD).

Jack Stephens
Neil mentions that he dropped a ruler next to Miss Timms.

Chris Groves
In the first episode of Series 2, Jay mentions that he has a mate in Year 13 by this name. It is alleged by Jay that he had sex with an older woman during a preceding Geography and Sociology field trip to the coast. He mentions his name again in the Series 3 preview. Due to the outlandish nature of Jay's claims, and Simon claiming he has never heard of him, it is questionable whether he even exists.

Sarah Bell
In the first episode of series 3, Neil is very annoyed that a curtain has been put up meaning he cannot see (or help) the girls getting changed for the fashion show. He mentions to Simon that he imagines that "Sarah Bell's got lovely big nipples", much to Sarah's disgust (who overhears from the other side of the curtain).

Jo Larken
Similarly to Sarah Bell, Neil quickly also tells Simon that he reckons "Jo Larken shaves her pubes" when he realises a curtain has been put up meaning he cannot see the girls.

Paul Keenan
In the first episode of Series 3, "The Fashion Show", Paul is supposed to be modelling with Charlotte Hinchcliffe in the 1970s disco theme section. However he supposedly drank a bottle of vodka and passed out due to a mix of alcohol and nerves, leading Will to take his place, despite his previous criticisms of the Fashion Show, saying it was "exclusive vanity".

Chris Yates
In "The Fashion Show", Chris is supposed to be modelling with Carli D'Amato in the "Sexy Finale" Theme in which he had to wear Speedos, DMs, a top hat and a leash. But, according to Carli, his back was "disgustingly hairy" so she sacked him. He can actually be seen in the episode, if one looks behind Carli whilst she is talking to Simon, he can be seen in the background with a hairy back.

Chris Wharton
A boy Jay claims he used to sit next to in woodwork class, and who now works in a newsagent's. During "The Trip to Warwick", Jay tells Neil and Will the story of how Wharton got his head stuck in a bottle bank and by the time he was found in the morning he had been "arse-raped eighteen times". Neil believes the story, but Will does not, questioning how the first eighteen people who found Wharton "turned out to be opportunistic homosexual rapists" and why Wharton would tell Jay about the ordeal due to its embarrassing nature.

Steve D'Amato
Steve is Carli's father. Carli tells Simon that he went ballistic when Simon vandalised their driveway, and Mr. Cooper tells Simon that Steve threatened to "fuck him up" when he sneaks into Carli's brother Chris' bedroom in the middle of the night, which he mistook for Carli's.

References

Channel 4-related lists
Lists of British sitcom television characters